The Protestant Telegraph was a Northern Irish newspaper founded by Noel Doherty and Ian Paisley on 13 February 1966. It was noted for its Protestant fundamentalism and its attacks on the Roman Catholic Church, the Church of Ireland and the moderates within the Ulster Unionist Party, as typified by Terence O'Neill.

It was criticised by Prime Minister James Chichester-Clark:

The paper was printed by the Puritan Printing Company, which was based at the Ravenhill Road, Belfast, headquarters of the Free Presbyterian Church of Ulster. The paper continued as a vehicle for Paisley and the Democratic Unionist Party (which was formed in 1971) until 1982 when Peter Robinson, who felt that the party would benefit from a less religiously denominational paper, persuaded Ian Paisley to wind up the Protestant Telegraph and replace it with The Voice of Ulster.

References

1966 establishments in Northern Ireland
Anti-Catholic publications
Christian newspapers
Newspapers published in Northern Ireland
Protestantism in the United Kingdom
Publications established in 1966
Publications disestablished in 1982